"You Beat All I Ever Saw" is a song written and originally recorded by Johnny Cash.

Released in November 1966 as a single (Columbia 4-43921, with "Put the Sugar to Bed" on the opposite side), it debuted on the U.S. Billboard country chart at number 66 on the week of December 24, eventually reaching number 20. On the Cash Box country chart, the song peaked at number 28 

Later the song was included on the U.K. compilation album More of Old Golden Throat (1969).

Background and analysis

Track listing

Charts

References

External links 
 "You Beat All I Ever Saw" on the Johnny Cash official website

Johnny Cash songs
1966 songs
1966 singles
Columbia Records singles
Songs written by Johnny Cash
Songs written by Maybelle Carter
Song recordings produced by Don Law